"From Zero to Hero" is a song by German recording artist Sarah Connor, written and produced by Rob Tyger and Kay Denar for Connor's fourth studio album, Naughty but Nice (2005). The song was released on 7 March 2005 as the album's second and final single and moreover served as the European theme song for the 2005 20th Century Fox animated film Robots, in which Connor voiced the character of Cappy. It became Connor's fifth number-one hit (and fourth in a row) in Germany, staying atop the German Singles Chart for three nonconsecutive weeks.

Track listings
European CD single
 "From Zero to Hero" (single version) – 3:45
 "From Zero to Hero" (I-Wanna-Funk-with-You radio cut) – 4:01

European maxi-CD single
 "From Zero to Hero" (single version) – 3:45
 "From Zero to Hero" (I-Wanna-Funk-with-You radio cut) – 4:01
 "From Zero to Hero" (I-Wanna-Funk-with-You extended version) – 5:47
 "When a Woman Loves a Man" – 4:31

Charts

Weekly charts

Year-end charts

Certifications

References

External links
 

2005 singles
2005 songs
Epic Records singles
Number-one singles in Germany
Sarah Connor (singer) songs
Songs written by Kay Denar
Songs written by Rob Tyger
Songs written for films
X-Cell Records singles